The National Association of Software and Service Companies (NASSCOM) is an Indian non-governmental trade association and advocacy group, focused mainly on the technology industry of India. Established in 1988, NASSCOM is a non-profit organisation. NASSCOM is the apex body for the US$ 227 billion Indian technology industry.

Events
In 2013, NASSCOM initiated a program promoting 10,000 startups in India by 2023. NASSCOM sponsors events targeting startups in India.
Events include:
 NASSCOM Product Conclave
 NASSCOM Emerge 50
 Global In-house Centers Summit
 Big Data Analytics Summit
 Diversity & Inclusion Summit
 HR Summit
 Nasscom Leadership Forum
 NASSCOM Engineering Summit 
 Annual Information Security Summit
 NASSCOM Innotrek

NASSCOM hosted the Nasscom International SME Conclave 2019 in January 2019 and 'FISITA 2018 World Automotive Congress' in October 2018.

Membership

Members of NASSCOM provide software development, software services, IT-enabled/BPO services. NASSCOM's role has primarily been to insure the availability of best possible service quality, and enforcement of intellectual property rights, in the Indian software and BPO industry. As of June 2007, more than 1,110 information technology companies in India were members of NASSCOM, which included domestic software/ITES companies, along with multinationals operating within India.

Employees and members of executive council of NASSCOM include:
B V R Mohan Reddy – Chairman of NASSCOM, 2015–2016
C. P. Gurnani – Chairman of NASSCOM, 2016–2017
Raman Roy – Chairman of NASSCOM, 2017–2018
Rishad Premji – Chairman of NASSCOM, 2018–2019
Keshav R. Murugesh – Chairman of NASSCOM, 2019–2020
UB Pravin Rao – Chairman of NASSCOM, 2020–2021
Rekha M Menon – Chairperson of NASSCOM, 2021–2022
Krishnan Ramanujam - Chairperson of NASSCOM , 2022-2023
R. Chandrasekhar – President of NASSCOM for 2013 – 2018 
Debjani Ghosh – President of NASSCOM, 2018–present

Partnership 
The Telangana AI Mission (T-AIM) partnered with Nasscom to impart Investor Connect programme to 30 start-ups in India as a part of its revv up initiative. Nasscom also partners with Karnataka State Higher Education Council.

See also
 Information technology in India
 List of Indian IT companies

References

External links
 

1988 establishments in Delhi
Trade associations based in India
Chambers of commerce in India
Ministry of Micro, Small and Medium Enterprises
Non-profit organisations based in India
Organisations based in Delhi
Organizations established in 1988
Information technology organisations based in India